SS Dessoug was a  wooden cargo ship which was built in 1864 for the Khedive of Egypt as Denton. She was noteworthy for being selected by Henry Honychurch Gorringe for the purpose of transporting the Cleopatra's Needle Obelisk from Egypt to New York City.  She was sold to Ocean Steam Company in 1880 and renamed Dessoug. She served between New York and Savanna for her final years.  In 1896 she sailed to Cow Bay, Long Island and broken up for scrap.

History

Denton was built in Hartlepool England in 1864 for the Khedive of Egypt.

She was selected by Henry Honychurch Gorringe for the purpose of transporting the Cleopatra's Needle Obelisk from Egypt to New York City. Realizing that lifting a roughly 200-ton stone up and placing it down into the cargo hold was beyond the technology of the day (and placing it as top-heavy deck cargo would capsize the ship), Gorringe devised a novel loading method. He had the ship moved to a sturdy dry dock. Cannonballs were used as bearings to move the obelisk inside. Thus loaded and the bow planks replaced, she left on 12 June 1880 for the United States. During the voyage her propeller shaft broke and was replaced using a spare while she was under sail power  from shore. 
(The obelisk in London also called Cleopatra's Needle was of similar weight; it was shipped in a purpose-built temporary vessel, the Cleopatra.)

She was later used between New York and Savannah until she was scrapped in 1890.

See also
Cleopatra (cylinder ship)
Cleopatra's Needle (London)
Egyptian obelisks (including others moved out of Egypt)

References

Ships built in Pennsylvania
1896 ships
Steamships